Tetsuharu (written: 哲治) is a masculine Japanese given name. Notable people with the name include:

, Japanese baseball player and manager
, Japanese voice actor
, Japanese footballer

Japanese masculine given names